One Love United FC is a British Virgin Islands football club based in Road Town, British Virgin Islands, competing in the BVIFA National League, the top tier of British Virgin Islands football.

In 2013–14, One Love United were runners-up of the BVIFA National League.

Current squad

References

Islanders